"Why" is one of the early songs performed by the Beatles when they were backing Tony Sheridan. It was first issued on Sheridan's French extended play called "Mister Twist" in 1962. In the UK, it is the B-side of the instrumental rock tune "Cry for a Shadow". Although it was originally intended to be the A-side, the record label Polydor chose not to release it (at that time). When the Beatles were gaining popularity by 1964, the record label decided to release it with "Cry for a Shadow" as the A-side and "Why" as its B-side. In the US and Canada, it was released as originally intended, by the North American record label MGM with "Why" as the A-side and "Cry for a Shadow" as the B-side, due to its being an instrumental. Both were included on the German compilation album The Beatles' First! in 1964 and on all its other reissues worldwide in subsequent years.

"Why" reached number 88 on the US Billboard Hot 100 the week ending April 18, 1964.  It spent only one week on the chart.

Personnel
 Tony Sheridan – lead vocals
 John Lennon – rhythm guitar
 Paul McCartney – bass guitar
 George Harrison – lead guitar
 Pete Best – drums
 Karl Hinze – engineer

References

1961 songs
1964 singles
The Beatles with Tony Sheridan songs
Polydor Records singles
MGM Records singles